Battles of Chief Pontiac is a 1952 American quasi-historical film directed by Felix E. Feist. The drama features Lex Barker, Helen Westcott and Lon Chaney Jr.

Plot
Conflict between Ottawa Native Americans, led by Chief Pontiac, and the British.

Cast
 Lex Barker as Lt. Kent McIntire
 Helen Westcott as Winifred Lancaster
 Lon Chaney Jr. as Chief Pontiac
 Berry Kroeger as Col. von Weber
 Roy Roberts as Maj. Gladwin
 Larry Chance as Hawkbill
 Katherine Warren as Chia
 Ramsay Hill as Gen. Sir Jeffrey Amherst
 Guy Teague as Von Weber's aide
 James Fairfax as Guardhouse sentry
 Abner George as Doctor

Reception

Critical response
Film critic Hans J. Wollstein gave the film a mixed review, writing, "Burly actor Lon Chaney, Jr. said that the role of Chief Pontiac in this cheap action-thriller from low-budget entrepreneur Jack Broder, was one he truly coveted. Unfortunately, Chaney and the rest of the cast were let down by a preachy and frankly dreadful screenplay by Jack de Witt ... Battles of Chief Pontiac was filmed on location near Rapid City, South Dakota, and the scenery remains its only attractive feature."

References

External links
 
 
 
 Battles of Chief Pontiac film at Hulu (free and complete)

1952 films
1950s historical films
1952 Western (genre) films
American historical films
American Western (genre) films
American black-and-white films
Films scored by Elmer Bernstein
Films about Native Americans
Films set in the 1760s
1950s English-language films
Films directed by Felix E. Feist
1950s American films